Porana Bhagpur is a town in the Islamabad Capital Territory of Pakistan. It is located at 33° 18' 40N 73° 19' 45E with an altitude of 435 metres (1430 feet).

References 

Union councils of Islamabad Capital Territory